The VTB United League Supercup, also credited as VTB League Super Cup, is a men's professional basketball supercup competition between teams from the VTB United League. Its main sponsor is VTB Bank. It is a regional competition, that is contested between teams from five countries: Russia, Belarus, Estonia, Kazakhstan and Poland. In the first edition of the Supercup in 2021 all participants were from Russia.

History
The VTB United League Council, held online on June 12, 2021, in the press center of the Russian news agency TASS, approved the creation of an annual Supercup with the participation of the best 4 teams of the previous regular season. The winner will be awarded the Alexander Gomelsky Cup, named after the legendary CSKA and Soviet national team coach.

The first tournament was organized by VTB United League in cooperation with the Moscow city Department of Sports and took place in Moscow, Russia.

Finals

All-time participants 
The following is a list of clubs that have played in the VTB League Supercup at least once since its formation in 2021.

Key

List of participants

Awards

MVPs

See also 
 Soviet Basketball Cup

References

External links
 

2021 establishments in Europe
VTB United League
Basketball competitions in Russia
Basketball supercup competitions in Europe